The Brain is a 1962 science fiction thriller film directed by Freddie Francis, and starring Anne Heywood and Peter van Eyck. A UK-West German co-production (also released as Ein Toter sucht seinen Mörder)

The Brain differs from earlier film versions of the Curt Siodmak 1942 novel Donovan's Brain: in this adaptation, the dead man seeks his own murderer through contact with the doctor keeping his brain alive.

Cast
Anne Heywood as Anna Holt
Peter van Eyck as Dr. Peter Corrie
Cecil Parker as Stevenson
Bernard Lee as Dr. Frank Shears
Jeremy Spenser as Martin Holt
Maxine Audley as Marion Fane  
Ellen Schwiers as Ella  
Siegfried Lowitz as Mr. Walters  
Hans Nielsen as Immerman  
Jack MacGowran as Furber  
Miles Malleson as Dr. Miller  
George A. Cooper as Thomas Gabler
Victor Brooks as Farmer at Crash Site (uncredited) 
Allan Cuthbertson as Da Silva (uncredited) 
John Junkin as Frederick (uncredited) 
Bryan Pringle as Dance-Hall MC (uncredited) 
Patsy Rowlands as Young Woman at Dance Hall (uncredited) 
Alister Williamson as Inspector Pike (uncredited)

References

External links

1962 films
West German films
English-language German films
Films directed by Freddie Francis
Films based on horror novels
Films based on American novels
1962 horror films
1960s science fiction thriller films
1960s science fiction horror films
British science fiction horror films
British science fiction thriller films
1960s English-language films
1960s British films